Allan Leitch (27 December 1902 – 1 July 1976) was an Australian rules footballer who played for New Town in the Tasmanian Football League (TFL) and Carlton in the Victorian Football League (VFL).

Leitch was one of eight Carlton debutantes in the opening round of the 1925 VFL season and played in all 17 games that year. A defender, he then returned to his original club, New Town, where he won the Wilson Bailey Trophy as the league's 'best and fairest'. The following season the award was renamed in honour of his father, William Leitch. He came close to winning it in 1931, finishing runner-up behind Albert Collier.

Amongst his 13 interstate appearances, Leitch represented Tasmania at the 1924 Hobart and 1930 Adelaide Carnivals. He had been selected for the Melbourne Carnival, in 1927, but was unable to make the journey. Leith also regularly played for the TANFL representative team, 24 times in all.

In 2000, Leitch was named in the back pocket of the official Glenorchy (New Town) 'Team of the Century' and in 2005 he was an inductee into the Tasmanian Football Hall of Fame.

References

Holmesby, Russell and Main, Jim (2007). The Encyclopedia of AFL Footballers. 7th ed. Melbourne: Bas Publishing.

External links

1902 births
1976 deaths
Carlton Football Club players
Glenorchy Football Club players
Australian rules footballers from Tasmania
Tasmanian Football Hall of Fame inductees